Spring Valley is a city in Fillmore County, Minnesota, United States. The population was 2,479 at the 2010 census.

History
Spring Valley was laid out in 1855, and named for a spring near the town site. A post office has been in operation at Spring Valley since 1855. Spring Valley was incorporated in 1872.

Geography
U.S. Route 63 and Minnesota State Highway 16 are two of the town's main routes.

Demographics

2010 census
As of the census of 2010, there were 2,479 people, 1,074 households, and 651 families living in the city. The racial makeup of the city was 97.6% White, 0.6% African American, 0.1% Native American, 0.5% Asian, 0.1% from other races, and 1.0% from two or more races. Hispanic or Latino of any race were 0.7% of the population.

There were 1,074 households, of which 31.1% had children under the age of 18 living with them, 45.6% were married couples living together, 10.5% had a female householder with no husband present, 4.5% had a male householder with no wife present, and 39.4% were non-families. 35.2% of all households were made up of individuals, and 16.7% had someone living alone who was 65 years of age or older. The average household size was 2.27 and the average family size was 2.90.

The median age in the city was 39.5 years. 23.8% of residents were under the age of 18; 8.4% were between the ages of 18 and 24; 24.2% were from 25 to 44; 24.8% were from 45 to 64; and 19% were 65 years of age or older. The gender makeup of the city was 48.8% male and 51.2% female.

2000 census
As of the census of 2000, there were 2,518 people, 1,026 households, and 662 families living in the city. The racial makeup of the city was 98.93% White, 0.08% African American, 0.24% Native American, 0.08% Asian, 0.04% from other races, and 0.64% from two or more races. Hispanic or Latino of any race were 0.44% of the population.

There were 1,026 households, out of which 32.4% had children under the age of 18 living with them, 51.3% were married couples living together, 10.0% had a female householder with no husband present, and 35.4% were non-families. 30.1% of all households were made up of individuals, and 14.7% had someone living alone who was 65 years of age or older. The average household size was 2.40 and the average family size was 3.00.

In the city, the population was spread out, with 26.1% under the age of 18, 8.3% from 18 to 24, 25.9% from 25 to 44, 20.4% from 45 to 64, and 19.4% who were 65 years of age or older. The median age was 38. For every 100 females, there were 89.9 males. For every 100 females age 18 and over, there were 87.1 males.

The median income for a household in the city was $32,688, and the median income for a family was $42,468. Males had a median income of $28,438 versus $22,225 for females. The per capita income for the city was $16,735. About 7.4% of families and 8.6% of the population were below the poverty line, including 10.4% of those under age 18 and 12.6% of those age 65 or over.

Elected officials

Notable people
 Richard Sears, founder of Sears, Roebuck and Company, was born in a neighboring town and grew up in Spring Valley.
 Almanzo Wilder, husband of Laura Ingalls Wilder, lived on a farm near Spring Valley.

See also
Spring Valley Public Library

References

External links
 Bluff County Reader - Current articles
 Spring Valley, Minnesota website

Cities in Fillmore County, Minnesota
Cities in Minnesota